Salom Yiu Kam Shing MH (born 4 February 1988) is a Hong Kong rugby union player. He plays for USRC Tigers RFC, the Hong Kong Rugby Sevens team and the Hong Kong national rugby union team.

Career 
Salom Yiu started his career after first watching the Hong Kong Sevens from the spectator stands and then doing more research on the sport. He was a member of the Hong Kong Rugby Sevens team at the 2009 East Asian Games. He was a Silver medal winner at both the 2009 East Asian Games and the 2010 Asian Games, falling both times to Japan. He became a full-time professional when Rugby Sevens became the first team sport admitted to the Hong Kong Sports Institute in April 2013.

In 2022, He competed for Hong Kong at the Rugby World Cup Sevens in Cape Town.

References 

1988 births
Living people
Hong Kong rugby union players
Hong Kong international rugby sevens players
Rugby union players at the 2010 Asian Games
Rugby union players at the 2014 Asian Games
Rugby union players at the 2018 Asian Games
Asian Games gold medalists for Hong Kong
Asian Games silver medalists for Hong Kong
Asian Games medalists in rugby union
Medalists at the 2010 Asian Games
Medalists at the 2014 Asian Games
Medalists at the 2018 Asian Games